Lin-ay sang Negros 2014, the 20th edition of the annual Lin-ay sang Negros pageant was held on April 4, 2014 at the Pana-ad Stadium. Twenty-two (22) ladies from different cities and municipalities of Negros Occidental participated in the pageant. Lin-ay sang Negros 2013 of Bacolod Samyah Al-dossary crowned Alexos Danica Drilon also of Bacolod.

Final Results

Contestants

Other Pageant Notes

Historical Significance
Alexis Danica Drilon became the fifth Lin-ay sang Bacolod to win the crown. This also marked Bacolod's third win in a row.
Shermen Rose Perez was Dinagsa Festival Queen's Second Runner-up. Because of the typhoon Yolanda, no pageant was held in Cadiz and she was handpicked to represent the city.

Panel of Judges
Sam Adjani - Model and Mister World Philippines 2016
Elaine Kay Moll - Miss 2012 Supranational third runner up
Jonas Gaffud - Mercator Wedding Manager
June Macasaet - Manhunt International 2013
Stephanie Stefanowitz. - Miss Earth Air 2013

Hosts
Charles Kevin Tan - Negrense song writer
Isabelle Daza - Model/Actress

Performances
GMA's My Husband's Lover stars Tom Rodriguez and Dennis Trillo

References

Beauty pageants in the Philippines
Culture of Negros Occidental
2014 beauty pageants
2014 in the Philippines